Pownal is an unincorporated community and census-designated place (CDP) in the town of Pownal, Bennington County, Vermont, United States. It was first listed as a CDP prior to the 2020 census.

The Hoosic River, a west-flowing tributary of the Hudson River, forms the western edge of the village. Vermont Route 346 passes through the center of the village, leading northwest  to North Pownal. It has its southern terminus in the eastern part of Pownal village, at U.S. Route 7, which leads north  to Bennington and south  to Williamstown.

References 

Populated places in Bennington County, Vermont
Census-designated places in Bennington County, Vermont
Census-designated places in Vermont